Cui Maohu (born December 1965) is a Chinese politician who was director of the National Religious Affairs Administration, and a deputy head of the United Front Work Department, from 2022 to 2023. He was a representative of the 19th National Congress of the Chinese Communist Party.

Career
Cui was born in Xuanwei County (now Xuanwei), Yunnan, in December 1965. In 1983, he was accepted to Yunnan University, majoring in philosophy. After graduating in 1987, he became a teacher at Qujing Finance and Trade School.

Cui got involved in politics in December 1989, and joined the Chinese Communist Party in May 1990. Cui was despatched to the Organization Department of the CCP Yunnan Provincial Committee in August 1994, becoming its deputy head in December 2007. He also served as head of Yunnan Provincial Human Resources and Social Security Department. In May 2017, he was named party chief of Lijiang, his first foray into a prefectural leadership role. He was appointed vice governor of Yunnan in May 2021 and six months later was admitted to member of the Standing Committee of the CCP Yunnan Provincial Committee, the province's top authority. He concurrently served as secretary-general of the CCP Yunnan Provincial Committee from November 2021 to June 2022.

In June 2022, he was chosen as director of the State Administration for Religious Affairs, concurrently serving as deputy head of the United Front Work Department.

Downfall
On 18 March 2023, he was put under investigation for alleged "serious violations of discipline and laws" by the Central Commission for Discipline Inspection (CCDI), the party's internal disciplinary body, and the National Supervisory Commission, the highest anti-corruption agency of China.

References

1965 births
Living people
People from Xuanwei
Yunnan University alumni
People's Republic of China politicians from Yunnan
Chinese Communist Party politicians from Yunnan